Soul Position is an American alternative hip hop duo hailing from Columbus, Ohio. It consists of DJ/producer RJD2 and rapper Blueprint. The duo has released two albums and one EP on Rhymesayers Entertainment.

Discography

Albums
 8 Million Stories (2003)
 Things Go Better with RJ and AL (2006)

EPs
 Unlimited EP (2002)

Singles
 "The Jerry Springer Episode" b/w "Share This" (2003)
 "Inhale" b/w "Inhale Remix" & "Right Place, Wrong Time" (2004)
 "Hand-Me Downs" b/w "Blame It on the Jager" (2006)
 "The Good Life" (as RJD2 Feat. Blueprint) (2012)

Mixtapes
 Mixtapes Go Better with RJ and AL (2006)

References

External links
 Soul Position on Rhymesayers Entertainment

Rhymesayers Entertainment artists
American hip hop groups
Midwest hip hop groups
Musical groups established in 2002
Musical groups disestablished in 2006
2002 establishments in Ohio
American musical duos
Hip hop duos
Musical groups from Columbus, Ohio